This is a list of Spring 1969 PGA Tour Qualifying School graduates. 

The tournament was played at the PGA National Golf Club in Palm Beach Gardens, Florida in April. The tour reduced the length of the tournament from 144 holes to 72 holes for the first time. There were 91 players in the field and 15 earned their tour card. The final three cards were determined in a six-man playoff. Bob Eastwood was the medallist at 291, three strokes ahead of Jerry Preuss.

Sources:

References

1969 1
1969 PGA Tour Qualifying School graduates 1
PGA Tour Qualifying School Graduates
PGA Tour Qualifying School Graduates